Timothy Ernest Victor Kwizera Agaba (born 23 July 1989) is a Ugandan-born South African rugby union player for the  in Super Rugby, the  in the Currie Cup and the  in the Rugby Challenge. His regular position is flanker or number eight.

He was a member of the South African Sevens team that won a bronze medal at the 2016 Summer Olympics.

Career

Youth : Border and Sharks

Agaba was born in Kabale, Southern Uganda, before moving to the Transkei and then East London, where he attended Stirling High School, where he took up rugby. In 2007, he was included in the Border team that played at the premier South African high school rugby union tournament, the Under-18 Craven Week held in Stellenbosch.

NMMU and Eastern Province Kings

He returned to the Eastern Cape in 2012, where he joined the Port Elizabeth-based university side  for the 2012 Varsity Cup competition.

He established himself as the first-choice eighth man for the NMMU Madibaz during the 2013 Varsity Cup, starting six of their eight matches in the competition as he helped NMMU qualify for the semi-finals of the competition for the first time.

The EP Kings finished the regular season in second place on the log to set up a semi-final match against the third-placed . Agaba also started this match and scored a try midway through the second half as the match finished 22-all after regular time, with the Kings eventually prevailing 32–29 after extra time.

Agaba again started the 2014 season by representing the NMMU Madibaz in the Varsity Cup competition. He scored one try for NMMU in their match against  as they qualified for the semi-finals for the second successive year.

The Eastern Province Kings played in the Premier Division of the Currie Cup after the competition was expanded from six teams to eight for the 2014 season. He started their 25–45 defeat to  a week later and also their final match of the campaign, which the Eastern Province Kings won, beating the  26–25 to secure their only victory in the competition.

South Africa Sevens

He left the Kings at the end of 2015, after the non-payment of player salaries allowed him to disengage himself from his contract, and joined the South African Sevens team on a two-year contract.

2016 Summer Olympics

Agaba was included in a 12-man squad for the 2016 Summer Olympics in Rio de Janeiro. He was named as a substitute for their first match in Pool B of the competition against Spain, with South Africa winning the match 24–0. He was also named as a replacement for their second match against France, where South Africa secured a 26–0 victory, and promoted to the starting lineup for their final match against Australia. Despite a 5–12 defeat in this match, South Africa still finished top of Pool B to set up a quarter final rematch against Australia, with Agaba named as a replacement in his side's 22–5 victory. He was also named as a reserve for their final two matches; South Africa lost 5–7 in their semi-final match against Great Britain to be eliminated from gold medal contention, but bounced back in their third-place play-off, securing a 54–14 victory over Japan to secure a bronze medal in the competition.

Statistics

References

External links
 
 
 
 
 

South African rugby union players
Ugandan rugby union players
Eastern Province Elephants players
Living people
1989 births
Sportspeople from Kampala
University of South Africa alumni
Nelson Mandela University alumni
Rugby sevens players at the 2016 Summer Olympics
Olympic rugby sevens players of South Africa
South Africa international rugby sevens players
Olympic bronze medalists for South Africa
Rugby sevens players at the 2018 Commonwealth Games
Olympic medalists in rugby sevens
Medalists at the 2016 Summer Olympics
US Carcassonne players
Blue Bulls players
Bulls (rugby union) players